Balajuk (also Romanized as Balajūk) is a village in Qotur Rural District, Qotur District, Khoy County, West Azerbaijan Province, Iran. At the 2006 census, its population was 742, in 129 families.

References 

Populated places in Khoy County